The Base Mérimée is the database of French monumental and architectural heritage, created and maintained by the French Ministry of Culture. It was created in 1978, and placed online in 1995. The database is periodically updated, and contains more than 320,000 entries as of October 2020. It covers religious, domestic, agricultural, educational, military and industrial architecture, and is subdivided into three domains: historical monuments, general inventory, and architecture (including remarkable contemporary architecture). The database was named after writer, historian and inspector-general of historical monuments Prosper Mérimée, who published the first survey of historic monuments in 1840.

See also
 Base Palissy, database of French movable heritage
 List of heritage registers globally
 Monument historique, the official classification for French historic monuments

References

External links

Search engine Base Mérimée

History websites of France
Government databases in France
Prosper Mérimée
1978 establishments in France
Architecture databases
Databases in France
Historic sites in France
Heritage registers in France